= Prva Liga Telekom =

Prva Liga Telekom may refer to:

- Prva Liga Telekom Slovenije, a top-division Slovenian football league
- Prva Liga Telekom Srbija, a second-division of Serbian football league
